Dictyothyris  is an extinct genus of brachiopods that lived from the Middle Jurassic to the Early Cretaceous throughout what is now Europe and North Africa.

Description
Like members of the Class Rhynchonellata, it is possible that members of this genus were blind. They were also likely stationary suspension feeders, relying upon ocean currents to obtain food.

Species
Species in the genus Dictyothyris include:
 D. badensis Rollier, 1918
 D. coarctata (Parkinson, 1811)
 D. dorsocurva (Etallon, 1863)
 D. gzheliensis (Gerassimov, 1955)
 D. kurri? (Oppel, 1857)
 D. laneolata Buckman, 1917
 D. luszowicensis Rollier, 1918
 D. rollieri Haas, 1889
 D. rossii (Canavari, 1882)
 D. smithi (Oppel, 1857)
 D. spinulosa Smirnova, 1968

References

Prehistoric brachiopod genera
Jurassic brachiopods
Cretaceous brachiopods
Prehistoric animals of Europe
Middle Jurassic genus first appearances
Early Cretaceous genus extinctions
Fossil taxa described in 1879
Fossils of Algeria
Fossils of the Czech Republic
Fossils of France
Fossils of Hungary
Fossils of Italy
Fossils of Romania
Fossils of Spain
Fossils of Switzerland
Fossils of Ukraine
Fossils of Great Britain